Wilberforce "Willie" Mfum is a retired Ghanaian football (soccer) forward who played professionally in Ghana and the United States. He was a member of the Ghanaian Olympic soccer team at the 1964 Summer Olympics.

Club career
Mfum played for Asante Kotoko in his native Ghana. In 1968, Mfum played for the Baltimore Bays of the National Professional Soccer League. In 1969, he joined Ukrainian SC of the German American Soccer League. In 1970, Mfum played for the Ukrainian Nationals of the American Soccer League. That season, he shared the ASL scoring title with Juan Paletta. In 1971, he signed with the New York Cosmos of the North American Soccer League.

National team
Mfum played for the Ghana Olympic football team at the 1964 Summer Olympics. He also played for the Ghana national football team. In 1963, he scored two goals in the final of the 1963 African Cup of Nations as Ghana took the title. He was the second leading scorer at the 1968 African Cup of Nations as Ghana finished runner-up.

Career statistics

International goals

References

External links
 NASL stats
 FIFA player profile

1936 births
Living people
Asante Kotoko S.C. players
Baltimore Bays players
German-American Soccer League players
Ghanaian footballers
Ghana international footballers
Ghanaian expatriate footballers
American Soccer League (1933–1983) players
National Professional Soccer League (1967) players
North American Soccer League (1968–1984) players
New York Cosmos players
Philadelphia Ukrainian Nationals players
Olympic footballers of Ghana
Footballers at the 1964 Summer Olympics
1963 African Cup of Nations players
1968 African Cup of Nations players
Expatriate soccer players in the United States
Ghanaian expatriate sportspeople in the United States
Africa Cup of Nations-winning players
Association football forwards